Annika Virpi Irene Saarikko (born 10 November 1983) is a Finnish politician and minister. On 5 September 2020, she was elected as the leader of the Finnish Centre Party.

Early life and education
Saarikko was born in Oripää, Finland. She has a bachelor's degree in educational science and a master's degree in philosophy (majoring in media studies) from the University of Turku.

Political career
On 14 June 2010, Saarikko was elected to the vice chair of the Centre Party. She was elected to the Parliament of Finland in 2011 Finnish parliamentary election. 

From 10 July 2017 to 6 June 2019 Saarikko served as the minister of family affairs and social services. On 6 June 2019, she was appointed as minister of science and culture. Saarikko took maternity leave on 9 August 2019, and the position was filled by Hanna Kosonen until Saarikko reassumed her post in August 2020. She became Deputy Prime Minister of Finland, traditionally held by the leader of the second largest party in the government coalition, in September 2020. 

In May 2021 Saarikko became Minister of Finance.

Other activities

European Union organizations
 European Investment Bank (EIB), Ex-Officio Member of the Board of Governors (since 2021)
 European Stability Mechanism (ESM), Member of the Board of Governors (since 2021)

International organizations
 Asian Infrastructure Investment Bank (AIIB), Ex-Officio Member of the Board of Governors (since 2021)
 European Bank for Reconstruction and Development (EBRD), Ex-Officio Member of the Board of Governors (since 2021)
 Nordic Investment Bank (NIB), Ex-Officio Member of the Board of Governors (since 2021)
 World Bank, Ex-Officio Member of the Board of Governors (since 2021)

References

1983 births
Living people
21st-century Finnish women politicians
Centre Party (Finland) politicians
Deputy Prime Ministers of Finland
Ministers of Finance of Finland
Female finance ministers
Finnish Lutherans
Government ministers of Finland
Members of the Parliament of Finland (2011–15)
Members of the Parliament of Finland (2015–19)
Members of the Parliament of Finland (2019–23)
People from Oripää
Women government ministers of Finland
University of Turku alumni